Frank Spruiell "Jakie" May (November 25, 1895 – June 3, 1970) was a professional baseball player.  He was a left-handed pitcher over parts of 14 seasons (1917–1921, 1924–1932) with the St. Louis Cardinals, Cincinnati Reds and Chicago Cubs.  For his career, he compiled a 72–95 record in 410 appearances, most as a relief pitcher, with a 3.88 earned run average and 765 strikeouts.

May won 35 games for the Vernon Tigers in 1922, breaking Cack Henley's record for wins in a Pacific Coast League season. May was a member of the National League pennant-winning 1932 Cubs, suffering the loss in the fourth and final game of the 1932 World Series against the New York Yankees.  In World Series play, he had a 0–1 record in two appearances, with an 11.57 earned run average and 4 strikeouts.

May was born in Youngsville, North Carolina and later died in Wendell, North Carolina at the age of 74.

See also
 List of Major League Baseball annual saves leaders
 List of Major League Baseball career hit batsmen leaders

References

External links

1895 births
1970 deaths
Major League Baseball pitchers
Baseball players from North Carolina
St. Louis Cardinals players
Cincinnati Reds players
Chicago Cubs players
Newnan Cowetas players
Macon Peaches players
San Antonio Bronchos players
Syracuse Stars (minor league baseball) players
Beaumont Exporters players
Vernon Tigers players
People from Youngsville, North Carolina

External links 
TV story about Jake May